Gabino Amparán Martínez (born October 9, 1968, in Ciudad Cuauhtémoc, Chihuahua), is a Mexican football manager of Indios de Ciudad Juárez.

References

External links
 

1968 births
Living people
Association football defenders
C.F. Cobras de Querétaro players
El Paso Patriots players
Footballers from Chihuahua
Mexican expatriate footballers
Mexican expatriates in the United States
Mexican football managers
Mexican people of Basque descent
Liga MX Femenil managers
People from Ciudad Cuauhtémoc, Chihuahua
Mexican footballers